The 1993 NCAA Division II men's basketball tournament involved 32 schools playing in a single-elimination tournament to determine the national champion of men's NCAA Division II college basketball as a culmination of the 1992-93 NCAA Division II men's basketball season. It was won by California State University, Bakersfield and Cal State Bakersfield's Tyrone Davis was the Most Outstanding Player.

Regional participants

*denotes tie

Regionals

South Atlantic - Fayetteville, North Carolina 
Location: Felton J. Capel Arena Host: Fayetteville State University

Third Place - Alabama A&M 79, Fayetteville State 62

West - Bakersfield, California 
Location: CSUB Student Activities Center Host: California State University, Bakersfield

Third Place - Grand Canyon 103, Chico State 98

Great Lakes - Evansville, Indiana 
Location: Physical Activities Center Host: University of Southern Indiana

Third Place - Southern Indiana 95, IPFW 93

East - Millersville, Pennsylvania 
Location: Pucillo Gymnasium Host: Millersville University of Pennsylvania

South - Troy, Alabama 
Location: Sartain Hall Host: Troy State University

Third Place - Tampa 79, Florida Southern 73

South Central - Edmond, Oklahoma 
Location: Hamilton Fieldhouse Host: University of Central Oklahoma

Third Place - Central Oklahoma 116, Missouri Southern State 109

New England - Manchester, New Hampshire 
Location: NHC Fieldhouse Host: New Hampshire College

Third Place - Bentley 109, St. Anselm 90

North Central - Grand Forks, North Dakota 
Location: Hyslop Sports Center Host: University of North Dakota

Third Place - Western State 81, Colorado Christian 71

*denotes each overtime played

Elite Eight - Springfield, Massachusetts
Location: Springfield Civic Center Hosts: American International College and Springfield College

*denotes each overtime played

All-tournament team
 Tyrone Davis (Cal State-Bakersfield)
 Danny Lewis (Wayne State (MI))
 Terry McCord (Troy State)
 Roheen Oats (Cal State-Bakersfield)
 Wayne Robertson (New Hampshire College)

See also
 1993 NCAA Division II women's basketball tournament
 1993 NCAA Division I men's basketball tournament
 1993 NCAA Division III men's basketball tournament
 1993 NAIA Division I men's basketball tournament
 1993 NAIA Division II men's basketball tournament

References
 1993 NCAA Division II men's basketball tournament jonfmorse.com

NCAA Division II men's basketball tournament
Tournament
NCAA Division II basketball tournament
NCAA Division II basketball tournament